An Jae-sung (born 28 May 1985) is a retired South Korean tennis player.

An has a career high ATP singles ranking of 289 achieved on 14 April 2008. He also has a career high doubles ranking of 454 achieved on 18 August 2008.

Early life and career
An attended Konkuk University. While a student, he represented South Korea in tennis at the 2006 Asian Games in Doha, Qatar, where he and his teammates won a gold medal in the men's team event, thus securing an exemption from his mandatory military service.

An has been a member of the South Korea Davis Cup team from 2005 until 2008, competing in the World Group first round tie in 2008 against Germany.

In 2008, he captured his only ATP Challenger Tour doubles title in Moncton, Canada.

He retired in 2014, and now runs a tennis academy in Jeju.

ATP Challenger and ITF Futures finals

Singles: 11 (3–8)

Doubles: 17 (9–8)

References

External links
 
 

1985 births
Living people
Konkuk University alumni
South Korean male tennis players
Tennis players at the 2006 Asian Games
Asian Games medalists in tennis
Asian Games gold medalists for South Korea
Medalists at the 2006 Asian Games
Universiade medalists in tennis
Universiade silver medalists for South Korea
Universiade bronze medalists for South Korea
Medalists at the 2007 Summer Universiade
People from Suncheon
Sportspeople from South Jeolla Province
21st-century South Korean people